Värska is a small borough in Setomaa Parish, Võru County in southeastern Estonia. At the 2021 Census, the settlement's population was 414. It's the most populous village of the Parish.

History
Värska was first historically mentioned in 1585. Värska is the birthplace of poet Paul Haavaoks (1924–1983).

Geography
Värska is located in the east of Võru county, near the border with Russia, 70 km southeast of Tartu. The town is in front of the Gulf of Värska, a dependency of Pskov Lake.

Landmarks
The parish is associated with the Seto Museum of Farming, opened in 1998. Also located in southern Värska in the village of Verhulitsa is the holy tree Verhulitsa Laudsi Pettäi.

See also
Saatse Boot

References

Boroughs and small boroughs in Estonia
Pskovsky Uyezd
Spa towns in Estonia
Tourist attractions in Võru County